Flora Bank is a bank in British Columbia, Canada, located at the edge of Chatham Sound, between Lelu and Kitson Islands at the north entrance to Inverness Passage, south of Prince Rupert. The bank was named after Miss Flora MacDonald, daughter of the manager of Inverness Cannery.

Ecology

Flora Bank is recognized as one of the largest eelgrass beds in British Columbia, the North Coast Wetlands Program have shown the area as important migratory/wintering waterfowl habitat, and the Canadian Department of Fisheries and Oceans have identified the area as important habitats for Skeena River juvenile salmon, as well as important eulachon habitat. Flora Bank is known as a critical habitat for juvenile epibenthic feeder species, such as chum, chinook, and pink salmon, which spend the early part of their marine life in shallow eelgrass beds and sheltered subestuaries.

Geography

The sediments of the Flora Bank are relics from 8000-year-old glacial deposits, the processes sustaining the bank by holding its sediments in place are still not fully understood.

References

Landforms of British Columbia